John Mark Holtom (born 6 February 1958 in Burton-on-Trent) is a male retired English athlete who specialised in the sprint hurdles.

Athletics career
Holtom competed in the event at two consecutive Olympic Games, in 1980 and 1984, as well as the 1983 World Championships.

He represented England in the 110 metres hurdles event, at the 1978 Commonwealth Games in Edmonton, Alberta, Canada. Four years later he represented England and won a silver medal in the 110 metres hurdles event, at the 1982 Commonwealth Games in Brisbane, Queensland, Australia.

In 1986 he represented England and in the 400 metres hurdles event, at the 1986 Commonwealth Games in Edinburgh, Scotland.

International competitions

Personal bests
Outdoors
110 metres hurdles – 13.43 (+1.9 m/s, Brisbane 1982)
400 metres hurdles – 49.49 (London 1985)
Indoors
60 metres hurdles – 7.69 (Dortmund 1983)

References

All-Athletics profile

1958 births
Living people
English male hurdlers
Sportspeople from Burton upon Trent
Athletes (track and field) at the 1978 Commonwealth Games
Athletes (track and field) at the 1982 Commonwealth Games
Athletes (track and field) at the 1986 Commonwealth Games
Commonwealth Games silver medallists for England
Commonwealth Games medallists in athletics
Athletes (track and field) at the 1980 Summer Olympics
Athletes (track and field) at the 1984 Summer Olympics
Olympic athletes of Great Britain
World Athletics Championships athletes for Great Britain
Medallists at the 1982 Commonwealth Games